"Charlie's Shoes", also known as "(I'd Like to Be In) Charlie's Shoes", is a song written by Roy Baham released as a single in 1962 by Billy Walker.  It was the only number-one country hit of Walker's career, spending two non-consecutive weeks at the top spot and 23 weeks on the chart.

Cover Versions
Guy Mitchell also released a version in 1962.  It failed to make the Billboard Hot 100 stopping well outside the chart at # 110. 
The song has also been cut by other artists such as Eddy Arnold's version in 1962. 
Faron Young.

Chart performance

References

1962 singles
Billy Walker (musician) songs
Guy Mitchell songs
1962 songs
Columbia Records singles
Song recordings produced by Don Law